Distance measures are used in physical cosmology to give a natural notion of the distance between two objects or events in the universe.  They are often used to tie some observable quantity (such as the luminosity of a distant quasar, the redshift of a distant galaxy, or the angular size of the acoustic peaks in the cosmic microwave background (CMB) power spectrum) to another quantity that is not directly observable, but is more convenient for calculations (such as the comoving coordinates of the quasar, galaxy, etc.). The distance measures discussed here all reduce to the common notion of Euclidean distance at low redshift.

In accord with our present understanding of cosmology, these measures are calculated within the context of general relativity, where the Friedmann–Lemaître–Robertson–Walker solution is used to describe the universe.

Overview

There are a few different definitions of "distance" in cosmology which are all asymptotic one to another for small redshifts. The expressions for these distances are most practical when written as functions of redshift , since redshift is always the observable. They can also be written as functions of scale factor 

In the remainder of this article, the peculiar velocity is assumed to be negligible unless specified otherwise.

We first give formulas for several distance measures, and then describe them in more detail further down. Defining the "Hubble distance" as

We also define a dimensionless Hubble parameter:

The Hubble parameter at a given redshift is then .

The formula for comoving distance, which serves as the basis for most of the other formulas, involves an integral. Although for some limited choices of parameters (see below) the comoving distance integral has a closed analytic form, in general—and specifically for the parameters of our universe—we can only find a solution numerically. Cosmologists commonly use the following measures for distances from the observer to an object at redshift  along the line of sight (LOS):

Comoving distance:

Transverse comoving distance:

Angular diameter distance:

Luminosity distance:

Light-travel distance:

Alternative terminology

Peebles (1993) calls the transverse comoving distance the "angular size distance", which is not to be mistaken for the angular diameter distance. Sometimes, the light-travel distance is also called the "lookback distance" and/or "lookback time".

Details

Peculiar velocity

In real observations, the movement of the earth with respect to the Hubble flow has an effect on the observed redshift.

There are actually two notions of redshift. One is the redshift that would be observed if both the earth and the object were not moving with respect to the "comoving" surroundings (the Hubble flow), let us say defined by the cosmic microwave background. The other is the actual redshift measured, which depends both on the peculiar velocity of the object observed and on our own peculiar velocity. Since the solar system is moving at around 370 km/s in a direction between Leo and Crater, this decreases  for distant objects in that direction by a factor of about 1.0012 and increases it by the same factor for distant objects in the opposite direction. (The speed of the motion of the earth around the sun is only 30 km/s.)

Comoving distance

The comoving distance  between fundamental observers, i.e. observers that are both moving with the Hubble flow, does not change with time, as comoving distance accounts for the expansion of the universe. Comoving distance is obtained by integrating the proper distances of nearby fundamental observers along the line of sight (LOS), whereas the proper distance is what a measurement at constant cosmic time would yield.

In standard cosmology, comoving distance and proper distance are two closely related distance measures used by cosmologists to measure distances between objects; the comoving distance is the proper distance at the present time.

The comoving distance (with a small correction for our own motion) is the distance that would be obtained from parallax, because the parallax in degrees equals the ratio of an astronomical unit to the circumference of a circle at the present time going through the sun and centred on the distant object, multiplied by 360°. However, objects beyond a megaparsec have parallax too small to be measured (the Gaia space telescope measures the parallax of the brightest stars with a precision of 7 microarcseconds), so the parallax of galaxies outside our Local Group is too small to be measured.

Our universe now seems to be closely represented by  In this case, we have:

where

The comoving distance should be calculated using the value of  that would pertain if neither the object nor we had a peculiar velocity.

Together with the scale factor it gives the proper distance at the time:

Proper distance

Proper distance roughly corresponds to where a distant object would be at a specific moment of cosmological time, which can change over time due to the expansion of the universe. Comoving distance factors out the expansion of the universe, which gives a distance that does not change in time due to the expansion of space (though this may change due to other, local factors, such as the motion of a galaxy within a cluster); the comoving distance is the proper distance at the present time.

Transverse comoving distance

Two comoving objects at constant redshift  that are separated by an angle  on the sky are said to have the distance , where the transverse comoving distance  is defined appropriately.

Angular diameter distance

This is commonly used to observe so called standard rulers, for example in the context of baryon acoustic oscillations.

When accounting for the earth's peculiar velocity, the redshift that would pertain in that case should be used but  should be corrected for the motion of the solar system by a factor between 0.99867 and 1.00133, depending on the direction. (If one starts to move with velocity  towards an object, at any distance, the angular diameter of that object decreases by a factor of )

Luminosity distance

This quantity is important for measurements of standard candles like type Ia supernovae, which were first used to discover the acceleration of the expansion of the universe.

When accounting for the earth's peculiar velocity, the redshift that would pertain in that case should be used for  but the factor  should use the measured redshift, and another correction should be made for the peculiar velocity of the object by multiplying by  where now  is the component of the object's peculiar velocity away from us. In this way, the luminosity distance will be equal to the angular diameter distance multiplied by  where  is the measured redshift, in accordance with Etherington's reciprocity theorem (see below).

Light-travel distance
(also known as "lookback time" or "lookback distance")

This distance  is the time that it took light to reach the observer from the object multiplied by the speed of light. For instance, the radius of the observable universe in this distance measure becomes the age of the universe multiplied by the speed of light (1 light year/year), which turns out to be approximately 13.8 billion light years.

If  then there is a closed-form solution for  but not for 

Note that the comoving distance is recovered from the transverse comoving distance by taking the limit , such that the two distance measures are equivalent in a flat universe.

The age of the universe then becomes , and the time elapsed since redshift  until now is:

Etherington's distance duality

The Etherington's distance-duality equation  is the relationship between the luminosity distance of standard candles and the angular-diameter distance. It is expressed as follows:

See also

 Big Bang
 Comoving and proper distances
 Friedmann equations
 Parsec
 Physical cosmology
 Cosmic distance ladder
 Friedmann–Lemaître–Robertson–Walker metric
 Subatomic scale

References

 Scott Dodelson, Modern Cosmology. Academic Press (2003).

External links
'The Distance Scale of the Universe' compares different cosmological distance measures.
'Distance measures in cosmology' explains in detail how to calculate the different distance measures as a function of world model and redshift.
iCosmos: Cosmology Calculator (With Graph Generation ) calculates the different distance measures as a function of cosmological model and redshift, and generates plots for the model from redshift 0 to 20.

Physical cosmology
Physical quantities
Length, distance, or range measuring devices